Heybatulla Hajialiyev is an Azerbaijani boxer born in 1991. At the 2012 Summer Olympics, he competed in the Men's light welterweight, but was defeated in the first round.

References

Azerbaijani male boxers
1991 births
Living people
Olympic boxers of Azerbaijan
Boxers at the 2012 Summer Olympics
Welterweight boxers
21st-century Azerbaijani people